The Fish Springs Range is a  long narrow, and north-trending mountain range located in center-west Juab County, Utah. The northeast of the range borders the Fish Springs National Wildlife Refuge; the entire east of the range borders the Fish Springs Flat, where the east region of the flat borders the Thomas Range.

The Fish Springs Range lies at the south of the Great Salt Lake Desert; southwards, as well as southwest and southeastwards, north-trending valleys and mountain ranges drain northwards to the Great Salt Lake Desert. The sequence of these landforms west-to-east, are Snake Valley (Great Basin), Confusion Range, Tule Valley-(Fish Springs Range-north), House Range, Whirlwind Valley, and Drum Mountains.

The south of the range borders the north of Tule Valley.

Range description
The Fish Springs Range is north-south trending, linear, narrow (mostly 3 to 4-mi wide), the range is veryslightly "arc-shaped", and curved, to the west.

A small sub-range, Middle Range, lies 6.5-mi southwest, towards the Confusion Range. Southeast lies the extreme north foothills of the House Range. Fish Springs Flat borders the east of the range, and west of the range lies a satellite sub-peak (only other regional peak), The Honeycombs, .

The highpoint of the range in the center-south is George H. Hansen Peak, .

Access
The Fish Springs Range and wildlife refuge can be accessed from the west from Trout Creek. From the east, access can be from the Dugway Range region by unimproved roads, and southeast by the same from Delta, and Utah State Route 174, (through the Sevier Desert).

References

External links
George H. Hansen Peak, mountainzone (coordinates)
Fish Springs & Fish Springs Range (north section), (Topoquest)
Fish Springs Range (center & south section), (Topoquest)

Great Salt Lake Desert
Mountain ranges of Juab County, Utah
Mountain ranges of the Great Basin
Mountain ranges of Utah